The 1988–89 División de Honor Juvenil de Fútbol, also known as Superliga Juvenil was the third season since its establishment.

League table

See also
1989 Copa del Rey Juvenil

External links
 Royal Spanish Football Federation website
Arquero-Arba Futbolme
Mundo Deportivo

1988
Juvenil